The International Journal of Speech-Language Pathology is a bimonthly peer-reviewed medical journal published by Speech Pathology Australia that covers any area of child or adult communication or dysphagia and issues related to etiology, assessment, diagnosis, intervention, or theoretical frameworks. A scientific forum is included in many issues, where a topic is debated by invited experts. The journal is edited by Sharynne McLeod (Charles Sturt University) and has been published since 1999.

References

External links 
 

Taylor & Francis academic journals
English-language journals
Bimonthly journals
Publications established in 1999
Audiology journals